The 2008 Reading Borough Council election to the Reading Borough Council resulted in gains for the Conservatives and the Liberal Democrats and losses for the Labour Party. The Labour leader of the council, David Sutton, lost his seat in the election.

Results

Ward results

References
 Local Election Results 2008

2008 English local elections
2008
2000s in Berkshire